Admiral Sir Robert Lindsay Burnett,  (22 July 1887 – 2 July 1959) was an officer in the Royal Navy.

Naval career
Educated at Eastman's Royal Naval Academy and Bedford School, Burnett joined the Royal Navy in 1902. He served on the China Station from 1904 and then with the Atlantic and Mediterranean Fleets from 1908. He became an instructor at the Navy Physical Training Schools in 1911.

Burnett served in World War I and saw action at the Battle of Heligoland Bight in 1914, at the Battle of Dogger Bank in 1915 and served in destroyers in the Grand Fleet. He was promoted to lieutenant commander in April 1918, commander in December 1923 and captain in December 1930.

In 1933 Burnett was made Director of Physical Training and Sports. He was promoted rear admiral in January 1941, appointed flag officer of minelayers and from March 1942 flag officer of the Destroyer Flotillas of the Home Fleet. From January 1943 he was flag officer of the 10th Cruiser Squadron and was promoted to vice admiral in that role on 9 December 1943. He was Commander-in-Chief, South Atlantic Station from 1944. He became Commander-in-Chief, Plymouth in 1947 and retired from active service in May 1950. He then served as the first director of the White Fish Authority, from its foundation in 1951 until his retirement in November 1954.

Family
In 1915 Burnett married Ethel Constance Shaw; they had no children. He was the younger brother of Air Chief Marshal Sir Charles Burnett.

References

External links

 RL Burnett at unithistories.com

|-

1887 births
1959 deaths
Scottish military personnel
People educated at Bedford School
Royal Navy admirals
Knights Grand Cross of the Order of the British Empire
Knights Commander of the Order of the Bath
Companions of the Distinguished Service Order
Commanders of the Order of St John
People from Banff and Buchan
People educated at Eastman's Royal Naval Academy
Royal Navy admirals of World War II
Recipients of the Order of Suvorov, 1st class